Marc-Antoine Camirand (born 30 April 1979) is a Canadian racing driver. He currently competes in the NASCAR Pinty's Series and is the 2022 NASCAR Pinty's Series champion.

Early career
Camirand began karting in the early 1990s, winning the F100 Junior class in the Quebec Karting Championship in 1993 and the Formula Super A class in the Canadian Karting Championship two years later in 1995.

Camirand moved to cars in 1996, beginning with the Formula Ford Canada championship. Camirand won the championship in 1997 and afterwards moved on the U.S. F2000 National Championship. He competed three full seasons in U.S. F2000, with a best finish of 2nd in the championship during the 1999 championship. Camirand made a handful of single-seater series appearances for the next few years, including in the Toyota Atlantic Series and the Formula Renault 2.0  Fran-Am series.

Sports car racing
Camirand made his sports car racing debut in 2002 in the American Le Mans Series with a pair of starts in the LMP675 class driving for Archangel Motorsports

From 2004 through 2008, Camirand participated in Rolex Sports Car Series in the United States. From 2005 onward, Camirand drove primarily for Spirit of Daytona Racing in the Daytona Prototype class. Camirand did not complete a full season during his Grand-Am career, instead only running partial schedules each year.

Touring car racing
From 2008 through 2012, Camirand participated in the Canadian Touring Car Championship in the Super Touring class. Camirand won several races in the series, including a record-breaking 11 victories at Circuit Trois-Rivières. Camirand's best finish in the championship was 5th in 2012.

NASCAR Canadian Tire/Pinty's series
Camirand made his debut in the NASCAR Canadian Tire Series in 2013 at Circuit Trois-Rivières driving for Derek White. Camirand made one further start that season Canadian Tire Motorsport Park. Camirand continued to drive for White through 2016, including a full season campaign in 2015, where he finished 7th in the championship.

In 2017, Camirand switched teams to drive for Scott Steckly. 2017 was another partial season, but Camirand began competing full-time for Steckly in 2018. During the 2018 season, Camirand picked up his first career race victory in the series at Autodrome St. Eustache en route to a sixth-place finish in the championship. Camirand continued to drive for Steckly's team in 2019 and 2021, picking up another race victory in 2021 at Canadian Tire Motorsports Park.

In 2022, Camirand moved to the GM Paillé Partners team. Camirand won three races during the season and accumulated nine top-5 finishes en route to his first Pinty's Series championship victory. Camirand led 803 laps during the season, the second most for a single season in series history.

Career results

NASCAR
(key) (Bold – Pole position awarded by qualifying time. Italics – Pole position earned by points standings or practice time. * – Most laps led.)

Canadian Tire/Pinty's Series

Sports car racing

24 Hours of Daytona results

References

1979 births
24 Hours of Daytona drivers
Living people
Racing drivers from Quebec
NASCAR drivers